Glance is an Indian artificial intelligence based software company that delivers personalised content to the lock screens of smartphones. Co-founded in 2019 by Naveen Tewari, Abhay Singhal, Mohit Saxena, and Piyush Shah and headquartered in Bangalore, Glance is owned by InMobi, a multinational technology company.

History

Glance owns and operates a screen zero platform that uses artificial intelligence technology to deliver personalised, relevant, ad-free, and live content across different categories such as games, stories, and news on the lockscreen of the users’ devices. It is the world's first.

In September 2019, Glance raised $45 million funding from the United States-based venture capital firm, Mithril Capital. In December 2020, Glance raised $145 million from Google and Mithril Capital, increasing its valuation to over $1 billion. It is the second company from the InMobi group to have become a unicorn.

In June 2022, Glance launched a three-day digital event called Glance LIVE Fest, with Bollywood actor Rajkummar Rao starring in their marketing campaign to promote it. The live and interactive digital event was accessible to anyone with Glance's lockscreen enabled on their smartphone. Glance LIVE Fest included live shows on sports, celebrity and creator-led entertainment, gaming, and shopping.

Technology 
The Glance software comes pre-installed on various android smartphone devices, such as Samsung, Xiaomi, Realme etc. Whenever a user unlocks the phone, the smartphone screen refreshes to load new visual and interactive content.

Apart from English, the content is available in six Indian languages - Hindi, Telugu, Tamil, Bengali, Marathi, Kannada - and Bahasa (Indonesia). Users spend around 25 minutes consuming content on Glance every day across 19 content categories including sports, news, entertainment, fashion, gaming, travel, and wildlife.

As of March 2022, Glance has 150 million active users, and currently partners with Oppo, Vivo, Samsung, Xiaomi, Realme and in talks with many other OEMs.

Acquisitions 
Glance acquired Roposo, a short-video platform, in November 2019, for an undisclosed amount to add vernacular video content to its platform. In June 2021, it acquired Shop101, a social e-commerce platform, for an undisclosed amount to integrate celebrity and influencer-led commerce on Glance and Roposo.In March 2022, it acquired Gambit, an Indian gaming company, for an undisclosed amount to accelerate Glance’s ambition of building the biggest platform for NFT-based live gaming experiences for Gen-Z, across markets.

References

External links

Companies based in Bangalore
2016 establishments in Karnataka
Indian companies established in 2016